The 48th District of the Iowa House of Representatives in the state of Iowa.

Current elected officials
Robert Bacon is the representative currently representing the district.

Past representatives
The district has previously been represented by:
 Harold C. McCormick, 1971–1973
 Wayne D. Bennett, 1973–1983
 Darrell Hanson, 1983–1993
 James F. Hahn, 1993–2003
 Donovan Olson, 2003–2011
 Chip Baltimore, 2011–2013
 Robert Bacon, 2013–present

References

048